The 10,000 metres at the 2000 Summer Olympics as part of the athletics programme were held at Stadium Australia on Wednesday 27 September, and Saturday 30 September 2000. The top eight runners in each of the initial two heats automatically qualified for the final. The next four fastest runners from across the heats also qualified. There were a total number of 41 participating athletes.

Records

Medalists

Results
All times shown are in seconds.
 Q denotes qualification by place in heat.
 q denotes qualification by overall place.
 DNS denotes did not start.
 DNF denotes did not finish.
 DQ denotes disqualification.
 NR denotes national record.
 OR denotes Olympic record.
 WR denotes world record.
 PB denotes personal best.
 SB denotes season best.

Qualifying heats

Overall Results Semi-Finals

Final

References

External links
 Official Report
 Official Report of the 2000 Sydney Summer Olympics

10000 metres, Men's
10,000 metres at the Olympics
2000 in women's athletics
Women's events at the 2000 Summer Olympics